Rabkin is a surname and may refer to:

David Rabkin (1948-1985) South African Anti-apartheid activist
Herman "Hesh" Rabkin, fictional character, advisor and friend to Tony Soprano in the HBO series The Sopranos
Jeremy A. Rabkin (born 1952), professor of law at George Mason University School of Law
Leo Rabkin, American artist
William Rabkin, American television producer, television writer and author
Yakov M. Rabkin, professor of history at the Université de Montréal, author and public intellectual

See also
Rabin
Rabkrin
Rakin (disambiguation)